Zhang Guotao (November 26, 1897 – December 3, 1979), or Chang Kuo-tao, was a founding member of the Chinese Communist Party (CCP) and rival to Mao Zedong. During the 1920s he studied in the Soviet Union and became a key contact with the Comintern, organizing the CCP labor movement in the United Front with the Kuomintang. In 1931, after the Party had been driven from the cities, he established the E-Yu-Wan Soviet. When his armies were driven from the region, he joined the Long March but lost a contentious struggle for party leadership to Mao Zedong. Zhang's armies then took a different route from Mao's and were badly beaten by local muslim Ma clique forces in Gansu. When his depleted forces finally arrived to join Mao in Yan'an, Zhang continued his losing challenge to Mao, and left the party in 1938. Zhang eventually retired to Canada, in 1968. He became a Christian shortly before his death in Scarborough, Ontario (a suburb of Toronto), in 1979. His memoirs provide valuable and vivid information on his life and party history.

Early and student life 
Born in Pingxiang County, Jiangxi, Zhang was involved in revolutionary activities during his youth. Zhang studied Marxist thought under Li Dazhao while attending Peking University in 1916. After his active role in the May Fourth Movement in 1919, Zhang became one of the most prominent student leaders and later joined the early organization of the CCP in October 1920. At the same time, Mao Zedong was a librarian working at Peking University; the two knew each other. Zhang acted as the CCP's top party official at the first National Congress of the Chinese Communist Party in 1921 and was elected a member of the Central Bureau of the CCP in charge of organizing the work of Professional revolutionaries. After the congress, Zhang held the position of Director of Secretariat of the China Labor Union and Chief Editor of Labor Weekly, from which he became an expert in labor unions and mobilization. He led several major strikes of railway and textile workers, which made him a pioneer of the labor movement in China along with such figures as Liu Shaoqi and Li Lisan.

Communist Party career 
In 1924 Zhang attended the First National Congress of the Kuomintang (KMT) during the policy of alliance between the Communists and the Kuomintang and was elected as Substitute Commissioner of Central Executive Committee. This was despite the fact that Zhang had opposed the alliance with Kuomintang in the Third National Congress of the CCP and had been reprimanded.  In 1925 in the Fourth National Congress of the CCP, Zhang was elected Commissioner of Central Committee of CCP and Director of Labor & Peasant Work Department. In 1926 Zhang was the General Secretary of Hubei Division of CCP, and in 1927 he was Commissioner of Interim Central Committee of the CCP after the failure of the CCP uprising. Zhang with Li Lisan and Qu Qiubai were the acting leaders of the CCP. At that time Mao only led a small number of troops in Jiangxi and Hunan. In 1928 Zhang was elected as a member of the politburo of the CCP in the Sixth National Congress held in Soviet Union, and then as a delegate of the CCP in Comintern.  But because of his disagreements with the Soviet Union and Comintern policies on the Chinese revolution, in the 1920s Zhang was taken into custody and punished in order to correct his mistakes. However, due to his fame and popularity in the communist world, he wasn't exiled like other dissidents were at that time.

In 1931 Zhang expressed his repentance and was sent back to China by the Comintern to clean up the mess left by the power struggle between the 28 Bolsheviks, Li Lisan, and other old CCP members.  Zhang used his fame and popularity to correct their extremism and appeased the old CCP members. But the damage done by the power struggle was so great that it was too difficult for the CCP to survive in the cities governed by the Kuomintang. Therefore, Zhang and other acting CCP leaders decided to move their groups to bases in the countryside. Zhang was assigned to lead the daily operation of E-Yu-Wan Revolutionary Base at the border of Hubei, Henan, and Anhui provinces as General Secretary and chairman of the military committee, and then Vice Chairman of the Interim Central Government of the Chinese Soviet Republic when Mao was the chairman. Possibly influenced by life in Stalin's Soviet Union, Zhang carried out strict purges to persecute dissidents.

Military leadership 

In 1932 Zhang led the 4th Red Army into Sichuan and set up another base. Slowly he turned it into a prosperous autonomous region by way of land reform and enlisting the support of locals, establishing the Northwest Chinese Soviet Federation. However, once the prosperity was in reach, Zhang repeated the Stalinist style purges again, as a result, he and the Red Army lost the popular support, and was driven from the Red base. In 1935 Zhang and his army of more than 80,000 reunited with Mao's 10,000 troops during the Long March. It was not long before Mao and Zhang were locked in disagreements over issues of strategy and tactics, causing a split in the Red Army. The main disagreement was Zhang's insistence on moving southward to establish a new base in the region of Sichuan that was populated by ethnic minorities.  Mao pointed out the flaws of such a move, pointing out the difficulties to establish any communist base in regions where the general populace was hostile, and insisted on moving northward to reach the communist base in Shaanxi. Zhang tried to have Mao and his followers arrested and killed if needed, but his plan was foiled by his own staff members Ye Jianying and Yang Shangkun, who fled to Mao's headquarters to inform Mao about Zhang's plot, taking the all of the codebooks and maps with them.  As a result, Mao immediately moved his troop northward and thus escaped arrest and possible death.

Zhang decided to carry out his plan on his own, with disastrous results: over 75% of his original 80,000 + troops were lost in his adventure. Zhang was forced to admit defeat and retreat to the communist base in Shaanxi. More disastrous than losing most of his troops, the failure discredited Zhang among his own followers, who turned to Mao.  Furthermore, because all of the codebooks were obtained by Mao, Zhang lost contact with Comintern while Mao was able to establish the link, this coupled with the fact of Zhang's disastrous defeat, discredited Zhang within Comintern, which begun to give greater support for Mao.

Zhang's remaining troops of 21,800 were later annihilated in 1936 by the superior force of more than 100,000 combined troops of warlords Ma Bufang, Ma Hongbin and Ma Zhongying during efforts to cross the Yellow River and conquer Ma's territory. Zhang lost the power and influence to be able to challenge Mao and had to accept his failure as a result of the disaster which only left him 427 surviving troops from the original 21,800.

In 2006, the writer and producer, Sun Shuyun, provided an account of the Long March that took exception to various ways in which the event has been propagandized.  Although critical of Zhang Guotao, she argued that there was no evidence of a so-called "secret telegram" that had been intercepted by Mao in which Zhang intended to use force against the Central Committee.  Moreover, she shows that the official History of the Chinese Communist Party was revised in 2002 to say that Zhang Guotao did not order the Western Legion into Gansu in order to build up his own power base.  Rather, all orders originated from the Central Committee .

End of CCP career and exile 

When Zhang reached the new CCP base at Yan'an, he had fallen from power and became an easy target for Mao. Zhang kept the now figurehead position of Chairman of Yan'an Frontier Area and was frequently subjected to humiliation by Mao and his allies. Zhang was too proud to ally with Wang Ming, who had recently come back from Moscow and was acting as the Comintern's representative in China. Zhang's popularity in the Comintern might have given him another chance of returning to power if he had allied with Wang. Another reason why Zhang did not ally with Wang was that Wang boasted that it was under his order that five senior CCP leaders (Yu Xiusong, Huang Chao, Li Te and two others—all opponents of Wang) had been arrested, and now worked for warlord Sheng Shicai in Xinjiang under the direction of the CCP. All five were tortured and executed in a prison under the control of Sheng Shicai, having been labeled as Trotskyists. However, Sheng Shicai was acting under direction from the CCP under Wang Ming. After that incident, Zhang despised Wang and would never consider supporting him.

Without any supporters, Zhang was purged in 1937 at the Extended Meeting of the Politburo of the Chinese Communist Party, after which he defected to the Kuomintang in 1938. But without any power, resources, and support, Zhang never held any important positions afterward and only did research on the CCP for Dai Li. After the defeat of the Kuomintang in 1949 he went into exile in Hong Kong. He emigrated to Canada with his wife Tzi Li Young in 1968 to join their two sons who were already living in Toronto. 

He gave his only interview in 1974, when he told a Canadian Press reporter, "I have washed my hands of politics". In 1978, he converted to Christianity under the influence of a Chinese scholar, Zhang Li Sang. After suffering several strokes, he died in a Scarborough, Ontario, nursing home on December 3, 1979, at the age of 82. He is buried in the Pine Hills Cemetery in Scarborough.

Zhang was highly critical of the proceedings of the first PRC Police leader Luo Ruiqing during the Chinese Civil War.

See also
Mao Zedong
Wang Ming

References

Further reading 

 Chang Kuo-t'ao, The Rise of the Chinese Communist Party (Lawrence: University Press of Kansas,  1971).
 Tony Saich, ed. with a contribution from Benjamin Yang, The Rise to Power of the Chinese Communist Party: Documents and Analysis  (Armonk, N.Y.: M.E. Sharpe,  1996 ). Extensive commentary and primary documents.
 Sun Shuyun, The Long March (London: Harper Collins, 2006).
 Benjamin Yang (Bingzhang Yang), From Revolution to Politics: Chinese Communists on the Long March. (Boulder: Westview, 1990; 338p. ). Detailed analysis of the conflict with Mao after the Zunyi Conference.
 Bill Schiller, "The man who could have been Mao", The Toronto Star, September 26, 2009. Useful summary of Zhang's life based largely on Chang Jung, Jon Halliday, Mao The Unknown Story (2005).

1897 births
1979 deaths
Chinese Christians
Chinese Civil War refugees
Chinese Communist Party politicians from Jiangxi
Chinese communists
Chinese emigrants to Canada
Chinese exiles
Converts to Christianity
Delegates to the 1st National Congress of the Chinese Communist Party
Delegates to the 2nd National Congress of the Chinese Communist Party
Delegates to the 3rd National Congress of the Chinese Communist Party
Delegates to the 5th National Congress of the Chinese Communist Party
Members of the Politburo Standing Committee of the Chinese Communist Party
Members of the 2nd Central Executive Committee of the Chinese Communist Party
Members of the 4th Central Executive Committee of the Chinese Communist Party
Members of the 6th Central Committee of the Chinese Communist Party
National University of Peking alumni
People from Scarborough, Toronto
People of the Chinese Civil War
Politicians from Pingxiang
Politicians from Toronto
Republic of China politicians from Jiangxi